Jerome Thor (January 5, 1915 — August 12, 1993) was an American actor of the stage and screen. He is best known for his work in Broadway plays from 1935 through 1946, and on American television during the 1950s. He starred as Robert Cannon in Foreign Intrigue; a role which popularized the trench coat-wearing detective in public consciousness. His costume is part of the collection at the Smithsonian Institution.

Early life
Born in Brooklyn, New York, Thor began his career as a stage actor.

Career 
Thor made his Broadway debut in 1934 at the 46th Street Theatre in Emmet Lavery's The First Legion. He appeared in numerous Broadway plays through 1946, including Anton Chekhov's The Marriage Proposal, William Saroyan's Get Away Old Man, Joseph Fields and Jerome Chodorov's My Sister Eileen, Clifford Odets's Golden Boy, and Leonid Andreyev's He Who Gets Slapped.

Thor transitioned into working as a television actor in the late 1940s and early 1950s with guest roles on several  American television anthology series, including Suspense and Studio One. His break through role was as Robert Cannon in the 1950s TV series Foreign Intrigue in which he popularized the image of the trench coat-wearing detective. Filmed in Europe, the syndicated mystery program ran from 1951 through 1955. The trench coat he wore for the series is part of the permanent collection of the Smithsonian Institution. When James Daly replaced him on the program, the producers attributed the change to Thor's wanting more money. Thor said, "I didn't ask for all that money . . . I was tired of doing everything — helping direct, rewriting scripts, even carrying camera equipment."

He portrayed the recurring character of Art Delgado in Hill Street Blues in the early 1980s. Shore also periodically worked as a film actor, appearing in Riot in Juvenile Prison, 55 Days at Peking, Love and Bullets, St. Ives, House of the Black Death, and 10 to Midnight.

Personal life 
Thor was married to actress Synda Scott until his death. He died of a heart attack in Westwood, Los Angeles, on August 12, 1993 at the age of 78.

Filmography

Film

Television

References

External links
Jerome Shore at IBDB
Jerome Thore at IMDB

1915 births
1993 deaths
American male stage actors
American male film actors
American male television actors